E63 or E 63 may refer to:

Airports 
 The FAA identifier for Gila Bend Municipal Airport

Transportation

Roads 
 European route E63, a highway in Finland
 Hidaka Expressway, route E63 in Japan

Vehicles 
 BMW E63, a 2003 platform number for the BMW 6 Series coupe (a luxury German automobile)
 Mercedes-AMG E 63 or E 63 S, a performance-oriented model designation for the Mercedes-Benz E-Class sedan (a luxury German automobile)

Technology

Mobile Phones 
 Nokia E63, a mobile phone manufactured by the Nokia Corporation